Amiga Ranger is an unreleased prototype personal computer by Commodore which was intended to be the second generation Amiga chipset, prior to ECS. It was designed by the original Los Gatos Amiga team including Jay Miner.

Overview
After the release of the Amiga 1000, Jay Miner began to design its intended successor, between 1986 and 1987. Code-named Amiga Ranger, it was planned to be highly expandable like Amiga 2000 with better graphics and CPU. The Ranger is said to have possibly included a 68010 or 68020 CPU.

Information for this new chipset remains unclear. However, the sound system may have still been the same as the original chipset. According to R. J. Mical, the new chipset kept the original 13-bit DAC for its CLUT but with quadrupled color registers from 32 to 128. The color palette would have remained at 4096 colors but the resolution could go up to 1024×1024 pixels with 128 colors (7-bit color depth).
  
Ranger used 2 MB VRAM as chip memory. In an interview, Jay Miner described benefits of using VRAM instead of DRAM; this gave the display system enough memory bandwidth for 1024×1024 pixel displays. From the known specification, it could be said that Ranger chipset was designed to compete with the Sharp X68000 and Apple Macintosh II personal computers (both released in 1987) which take advantage of VRAM technology.

Jay Miner made sure that the Ranger chipset was completed and fully tested before he left Commodore in hope that one day the company would release it.  But at that time, VRAM was considered expensive compared to DRAM, so Commodore refused to release Ranger for its high price which was unsuitable for the low-end systems like Amiga 500 to cover its costs. Dale Luck is in possession of a Ranger system prototype, but it's unknown what state it is in.

In a few years, VRAM costs dropped to be only 20% more than DRAM, so Commodore planned to use VRAM in the AAA chipset, the next-gen Amiga chipset left in an unfinished state when the company went into voluntary liquidation in 1994.

Some thoughts of a built-in blitter per playfield designed in Ranger had been rejected by Dave Haynie.  However, a post on Team Amiga explained the Ranger idea:

References
 Amiga history guide article about Ranger
 R.J.Mical gives some information about Ranger in an interview
 Jay Miner interview about next generation Amiga
 Article about Amiga Ranger (french)
 Photo of Dale Luck's ranger prototype

See also

 Original Amiga chipset
 Enhanced Chip Set
 Advanced Graphics Architecture
 AAA chipset
 Hombre chipset
 Sharp X68000
 List of home computers by video hardware

Amiga chipsets
Graphics chips